Ivan Iliev (born 28 December 1946 in Batin, Ruse, Bulgaria) is a Bulgarian Freestyle wrestler who competed in the 1972 Summer Olympics.

Iliev had the following finishes at major championships:

- Gold medal 1969 World Championship - Mar del Plata: 82.0 kg. Freestyle (1st);

- Bronze medal 1969 European Championship - Sofia: 82.0 kg. Freestyle (3rd);

- Silver medal 1970 European Championship - Berlin: 82.0 kg. Freestyle (2nd);

- Silver medal 1972 European Championship - Katowice: 82.0 kg. Freestyle (2nd).

Awards
In 1972 he was awarded “The Golden Belt – Dan Kolov".

References

 Иван Илиев // сайт на Българската федерация по борба
 https://shampionitebg.alle.bg/шампиони/световни/

1946 births
Living people
Olympic wrestlers of Bulgaria
Wrestlers at the 1972 Summer Olympics
Bulgarian male sport wrestlers
Sportspeople from Ruse, Bulgaria
World Wrestling Championships medalists